The Czechoslovakia men's national tennis team competed from 1921–1992, winning the tournament once, in 1980. From 1993, the nations competed as:

Czech Republic Davis Cup team (historical records assumed by Czech Republic)
Slovakia Davis Cup team

See also
Czechoslovakia Fed Cup team

External links

δ Czechoslovakia
Davis